Oscar Peterson Trio + One is a 1964 album by Oscar Peterson, featuring Clark Terry.

Track listing
"Brotherhood of Man" (Frank Loesser) – 3:32
"Jim" (Caesar Petrillo, Milton Samuels, Nelson Shawn) – 3:01
"Blues for Smedley" (Oscar Peterson) – 6:56
"Roundalay" (Peterson) – 3:55
"Mumbles" (Clark Terry) – 2:01
"Mack the Knife" (Bertolt Brecht, Kurt Weill) – 5:16
"They Didn't Believe Me" (Jerome Kern, Herbert Reynolds) – 4:21
"Squeaky's Blues" (Peterson) – 3:28
"I Want a Little Girl" (Murray Mencher, Billy Moll) – 5:10
"Incoherent Blues" (Terry) – 2:42

on tracks 2 and 7 Terry plays flugelhorn
on tracks 5 and 10 Terry sings or mumbles

CD re-issue
The album was re-issued on CD, in a gatefold sleeve, with an additional sleeve-notes booklet, in 1998 by PolyGram. In 2012 it was re-issued by Verve (Universal Music Group).

Personnel

Clark Terry – trumpet, flugelhorn, vocal
Oscar Peterson – piano
Ray Brown – double bass
Ed Thigpen – drums

References

External links 
 

1964 albums
Oscar Peterson albums
Albums produced by Norman Granz
Verve Records albums